Filisur is an Alpine village and former municipality in the Albula Region in the canton of Graubünden in Switzerland. The village  sits on a hillside with a view to the west where the two rivers Albula/Alvra from the Albula Pass and Landwasser from Davos meet. On 1 January 2018 the former municipalities of Bergün/Bravuogn and Filisur merged into the new municipality of Bergün Filisur.

History

Filisur is first mentioned in 1262 as villa Fallisour.

Geography
 
Of this area, 18.1% is used for agricultural purposes, while 46.6% is forested. Of the rest of the land, 1.6% is settled (buildings or roads) and the remainder (33.7%) is non-productive (rivers, glaciers or mountains).

Before 2017, the municipality was located in the Bergün subdistrict of the Albula district, since 2017 it is part of the Albula Region.

Demographics
, 14.1% of the population was made up of foreign nationals. Over the last 10 years the population has grown at a rate of 0.8%. Most of the population speaks German (84.5%), with Italian being second most common (6.7%) and Romansh being third (3.0%).

, the gender distribution of the population was 49.5% male and 50.5% female.  The age distribution, in Filisur is; 58 people or 12.4% of the population are between 0 and 9 years old.  36 people or 7.7% are 10 to 14, and 23 people or 4.9% are 15 to 19.  Of the adult population, 60 people or 12.9% of the population are between 20 and 29 years old.  57 people or 12.2% are 30 to 39, 67 people or 14.4% are 40 to 49, and 72 people or 15.5% are 50 to 59.  The senior population distribution is 39 people or 8.4% of the population are between 60 and 69 years old, 31 people or 6.7% are 70 to 79, there are 17 people or 3.6% who are 80 to 89, and there are 6 people or 1.3% who are 90 to 99.

In the 2007 federal election the most popular party was the FDP which received 36.5% of the vote.  The next three most popular parties were the SVP (33.3%), the SPS (22%) and the CVP (6.5%).

In Filisur about 69.4% of the population (between age 25-64) have completed either non-mandatory upper secondary education or additional higher education (either university or a Fachhochschule).

Filisur has an unemployment rate of 2.02%.  , there were 72 people employed in the primary economic sector and about 10 businesses involved in this sector.  34 people are employed in the secondary sector and there are 8 businesses in this sector.  86 people are employed in the tertiary sector, with 16 businesses in this sector.

The historical population is given in the following table:

 Population increase during construction of the Rhaetian Railway line

Weather
Filisur has an average of 109.9 days of rain per year and on average receives  of precipitation. During this month there is precipitation for an average of 12.3 days.

Heritage sites of national significance

The castle ruins of Greifenstein and the Schmittentobel-Landwasser Viaduct of the Rhaetian Railway are listed as Swiss heritage sites of national significance.

Transportation
Filisur's railway station is located in the northwest of the village 50 metres above the center and served by the Rhaetian Railway (RhB), the Glacier Express and the Bernina Express on the route between Chur and St. Moritz. It is also the end station for the line to Davos.

PostBus Switzerland also operate services through the village.

References

External links
 Official website 
 

Former municipalities of Graubünden
Cultural property of national significance in Graubünden
Bergün Filisur